Jonathan Mark O'Brien (born 2 November 1961) is an English former footballer who played as a goalkeeper.

Career
In 1984, O'Brien signed for hometown club Southend United on non-contract terms, after playing for Maldon Town and Tilbury. After new manager Bobby Moore was appointed Southend manager, O'Brien was invited to train with the first team. On 10 November 1984, O'Brien made his Southend debut in a 2–1 home victory against Peterborough United. Following another ten Football League appearances for Southend, O'Brien dropped back into non-league, playing for Chelmsford City, Dartford, Barking, Hitchin Town, Wivenhoe Town and Great Wakering Rovers.

References

1961 births
Living people
Association football goalkeepers
English footballers
Sportspeople from Southend-on-Sea
Maldon & Tiptree F.C. players
Tilbury F.C. players
Southend United F.C. players
Chelmsford City F.C. players
Dartford F.C. players
Barking F.C. players
Hitchin Town F.C. players
Wivenhoe Town F.C. players
Great Wakering Rovers F.C. players
English Football League players